Kikko Terrace is a rocky terrace rising to  about  south-southeast of Cape Hinode, Antarctica. The feature was mapped by the Japanese Antarctic Research Expedition from surveys and air photos obtained 1957–62. The Japanese form of the name, "Kikko-ga-hara" (tortoise shells terrace), and the English form, Kikko Terrace, were given by the Antarctic Place-Names Committee of Japan in 1973.

References

Plains of Queen Maud Land
Prince Olav Coast